Emilio Oupapa Martin (born 15 August 1990) is a Namibian footballer who plays as a defensive midfielder for Black Africa and the Namibia national football team.

References

1990 births
Living people
Namibian men's footballers
People from Oshana Region
Association football midfielders
Ramblers F.C. players
Black Africa S.C. players
Namibia international footballers
Namibia A' international footballers
2018 African Nations Championship players
2020 African Nations Championship players